Melese farri is a moth of the family Erebidae. It was described by Catherine P. Murphy and Eric Garraway in 2007. It is found on Jamaica.

References

Melese
Moths described in 2007
Arctiinae of South America